The Trans-Mexican Volcanic Belt pine–oak forests is a subtropical coniferous forest ecoregion of the Trans-Mexican Volcanic Belt of central Mexico.

Setting

The main mass of the volcanic belt extends east to west through the states of Jalisco, Michoacán, México, Morelos, Tlaxcala, Puebla, and Veracruz. The ecoregion includes the smaller mountain ranges which rise from the Mexican Plateau, including the Sierra de Santa Rosa, Sierra de Lobos, and Sierra de Pénjamo in Guanajuato, and northwards to El Gogorrón National Park in San Luis Potosí.

The pine–oak forests are surrounded by tropical dry forests at lower elevations to the west, northwest, and south; the Jalisco dry forests to the west and southwest; the Balsas dry forests to the south in the basin of the Balsas River, and the Bajío dry forests to the northwest in the basin of the Río Grande de Santiago and the lower Rio Lerma. The Central Mexican matorral lies to the north of the range in the high basins of the Plateau, including the Valley of Mexico and the upper reaches of the Lerma around Toluca. The Tehuacán Valley matorral lies in the rain shadow valley to the southeast in Puebla and Tlaxcala states. To the east, the moist Veracruz montane forests and Oaxacan montane forests are the transition between the pine–oak forests and the lowland tropical forests along the Gulf of Mexico.

Pockets of montane grassland and shrubland can be found among the pine–oak forests, and constitute a separate ecoregion, the Zacatonal.

Flora
The chief plant communities are pine forests, pine–oak forests, oak forests, pine–cedar forests, and pine–fir forests. The plant communities vary with elevation and rainfall.

Pine forests are generally found between 2,275 and 2,600 m. Pine–oak forests occur between 2,470 and 2,600 m. Pine–cedar forests can be found above 2,700 m. Pine–fir forests occur above 3000 m.

In the pine forests, Montezuma pine (Pinus montezumae) is generally predominant, with smooth-bark Mexican pine (P. pseudostrobus) predominant in more humid areas, and Hartweg's pine (P. hartwegii) and P. tecote in dry areas with shallow soils.

Pine–fir forests are composed almost entirely of Hartweg's pine (Pinus hartwegii) and sacred fir (Abies religiosa).

The western portion of the ecoregion, in western Jalisco and Colima states, is home to several endemic species. Quercus iltisii is found in the mountains of Jalisco and Colima. Quercus cualensis is known only from the  Sierra el Cuale in western Jalisco between 1,800 and 2,300 meters elevation, and is endangered. Quercus tuitensis is found only in the lower montane forests of Jalisco's Sierra el Tuito. Magnolia iltisiana is found in the Manantlán and Cacoma sierras of Jalisco and near Morelia in Michoacán. Acer binzayedii is known only from the Sierra de Manantlán. Pinus jaliscana is also endemic to western Jalisco, where it is found mostly in the Sierra el Cuale and Sierra el Tuito.

Fauna
The Transvolcanic jay, (Aphelocoma ultramarina), Sierra Madre sparrow (Xenospiza baileyi) and the green-striped brushfinch (Atlapetes virenticeps) are near-endemic species, limited to the pine–oak forests of the Transvolcanic Range and the southern Sierra Madre Occidental. Other native birds include the great horned owl (Bubo virginianus), long-tailed wood partridge (Dendrortyx macroura), white-tipped dove (Leptotila verreauxi), Montezuma quail (Cyrtonyx montezumae), banded quail (Philortx fasciatus), northern bobwhite (Colinus virginianus), and grey-barred wren (Campylorhynchus megalopterus).

The volcano rabbit (Romerolagus diazi) and the Mexican volcano mouse (Neotomodon alstoni) are endemic to the ecoregion.

Monarch butterflies
The Volcanic Belt pine–oak forests of eastern Michoacán and western México states is the winter habitat of monarch butterflies (Danaus plexippus), which migrate from temperate regions of North America east of the Rocky Mountains. The Mariposa Monarca Biosphere Reserve is within this habitat.

Protected areas
17.85% of the ecoregion is in protected areas. Protected areas include:

 Barranca del Cupatitzio National Park
 Bosencheve National Park
 Cañón del Río Blanco National Park
 Cerro de Garnica National Park
 Chichinautzin Biological Corridor
 Ciénegas del Lerma Flora and Fauna Protection Area
 Cofre de Perote National Park (Nauhcampatépetl)
 Cumbres del Ajusco National Park
 Desierto del Carmen National Park (Nixcongo)
 Desierto de los Leones National Park
 Fuentes Brotantes de Tlalpan National Park
 El Gogorrón National Park
 Insurgente Miguel Hidalgo y Costilla National Park
 Insurgente José María Morelos National Park
 Iztaccíhuatl–Popocatépetl National Park
 El Jabalí Flora and Fauna Protection Area
 Lagunas de Zempoala National Park
 Lomas de Padierna National Park
 Los Remedios National Park
 La Malinche National Park (Matlalcuéyatl)
 Monarch Butterfly Biosphere Reserve
 Nevado de Toluca Flora and Fauna Protection Area
 Pico de Orizaba National Park
 Pico de Tancítaro Flora and Fauna Protection Area
 La Primavera Biosphere Reserve
 Rayón National Park
 Sacromonte National Park
 Sierra de los Agustinos Sustainable Use Area
 Sierra de Huautla Biosphere Reserve
 Sierra de Lobos Sustainable Use Area
 Sierra de Manantlán Biosphere Reserve
 Sierra de Quila Flora and Fauna Protection Area
 Sierra de Vallejo Biosphere Reserve
 El Tepozteco National Park
 Volcán Nevado de Colima National Park
 Xicoténcatl National Park
 Zona Protectora Forestal los terrenos constitutivos de las cuencas de los ríos Valle de Bravo, Malacatepec, Tilostoc y Temascaltepec

See also
Pine-oak Forests of Puebla, Mexico
Conifers of Mexico
List of ecoregions in Mexico

References

Trans-Mexican Volcanic Belt
Tropical and subtropical coniferous forests
Ecoregions of Mexico
Neotropical ecoregions
 
Forests of Mexico
Montane forests
Natural history of Colima
Natural history of Guanajuato
Natural history of Guerrero
Natural history of Hidalgo (state)
Natural history of Jalisco
Natural history of Michoacán
Natural history of the State of Mexico
Natural history of Morelos
Natural history of Puebla
Natural history of San Luis Potosí
Natural history of Tlaxcala
Natural history of Veracruz
Natural history of Zacatecas